"Oh No" is a song by American rappers Mos Def and Pharoahe Monch featuring American singer Nate Dogg. It was released in November 2000 by Rawkus Records, as a single from the compilation album Lyricist Lounge 2 (2000). The song was produced by Rockwilder.

Background
Pharoahe Monch has stated that he never thought about collaborating with Nate Dogg on the track until Mos Def proposed it in a phone call. After hearing Nate sing in the chorus, Monch praised the idea.

Track listing
Track listing acquired from Discogs:

A1: Oh No (Explicit) (3:59)

A2: Oh No (Instrumental) (3:38)

B1: Get Up (Explicit) (3:53)

-Performed by Cocoa Brovaz

B2: Get Up (Instrumental) (3:53)

Charts

References

2000 singles
2000 songs
Mos Def songs
Nate Dogg songs
Pharoahe Monch songs
Rawkus Records singles
Song recordings produced by Rockwilder
Songs written by Mos Def
Songs written by Nate Dogg
Songs written by Rockwilder